Hebeloma sordescens is a species of mushroom in the family Hymenogastraceae. The species was described as new to science in 1989.

References

Fungi described in 1989
Fungi of Europe
sordescens